PTA may refer to:

Organizations
 Andalusia Technology Park, a science park in Málaga, Spain
 Pakistan Telecommunication Authority, an agency in Pakistan responsible for communication networks.
 Parent–teacher association, an organization of parents, teachers, and staff at a school
 Passenger transport authority, a United Kingdom local government authority 
 Public Transport Authority (Denmark)
 Public Transport Authority (Western Australia)

Science and medicine
 1,3,5-Triaza-7-phosphaadamantane, organic compound
 Percutaneous transluminal angioplasty, surgical procedure
 Peritonsillar abscess
 Persistent truncus arteriosus, congenital heart disease
 Pharmacy Technical Assistant
 Phosphate acetyltransferase, enzyme
 Physical Therapist Assistant
 Plasma thromboplastin antecedent, blood enzyme
 Plasma Transferred Arc, coating technology
 Post-traumatic amnesia, state of confusion following a traumatic brain injury
 Pulsar timing array, technique to detect gravitational waves
 Pure tone audiometry, hearing test
 Purified terephthalic acid, organic compound used to make polyester

Other uses
 Paul Thomas Anderson, American filmmaker
 Planes, Trains and Automobiles, a 1987 American film by John Hughes
 Pohakuloa Training Area, a military training facility
 Point of total assumption, a contract term
 Preferential trading area, a type of trading bloc
 Pretoria, the administrative and de facto capital of South Africa
 Prevention of Terrorism Act, the name of several countries' Acts of Parliament
 Program test authority, after a construction permit but before a broadcast license
 Port Talbot Parkway railway station in Wales (station code)
 a possible mnemonic symbol for Peseta, the former Spanish currency